Serhiy Mykolayovych Napolov (born 27 January 1996) is a Ukrainian professional footballer who plays as a left midfielder for KP Starogard Gdański.

Career
Napolov is a product of the RVUFK Kyiv Sportive School system.

He spent his career in the Ukrainian Premier League Reserves club FC Metalurh Donetsk. In July 2015 Napolov signed a contract with FC Metalist and was promoted to the Ukrainian Premier League's squad. He made his debut for Metalist Kharkiv in the Ukrainian Premier League in a match against FC Stal Dniprodzerzhynsk on 24 April 2016. In January 2017 he signed a contract with Chrobry Glogow.

On 4 August 2020, he joined Chojniczanka Chojnice in the Polish third-tier II liga.

References

External links

1996 births
Living people
Footballers from Chernihiv
Piddubny Olympic College alumni
Ukrainian footballers
Ukraine youth international footballers
Association football midfielders
FC Metalurh Donetsk players
FC Metalist Kharkiv players
FC Metalist 1925 Kharkiv players
Chrobry Głogów players
Warta Poznań players
Chojniczanka Chojnice players
FC VPK-Ahro Shevchenkivka players
FC LNZ Cherkasy players
Ukrainian Premier League players
Ukrainian First League players
Ukrainian Amateur Football Championship players
I liga players
II liga players
III liga players
Ukrainian expatriate footballers
Expatriate footballers in Poland
Ukrainian expatriate sportspeople in Poland